Mission Ridge Ski Area is a ski area in the western United States, located near Wenatchee, Washington.

Alpine skiing 
1 High speed detachable quad, with bubbles
3 fixed grip double chairlifts
2 rope tows

Mission Ridge has a relatively small terrain park, called the B-24 terrain park.

The ski area has had night skiing and snowmaking since 1978, and expanded the snowmaking capacity in 2005.

Base facilities 
The Hampton Lodge at the base of the mountain includes a restaurant, bar, shop, and rental center. Additionally, facilities in the base area include lesson centers, a childcare center, and first aid operations.

History
The name "Mission Ridge" was selected in June 1964, and it began operations  in the fall of 1966 with two chairlifts in the Squilchuck Basin, where a Walla Walla-based B-24 Liberator bomber crashed on September 30, 1944.  2 more lifts were constructed in 1970 and 1972. A wing section of the B-24 plane was removed from the mountain and taken down to the lodge in 1985; it was hauled back up the mountain in October 1992, and mounted on steel poles above "Bomber Bowl."

Bill Johnson, the gold medalist in downhill at the 1984 Winter Olympics, trained at the Mission Ridge Ski Academy as a teenager. In 2005, the new Liberator Express replaced Chair 2, and then in 2020, the Wenatchee Express bubble lift replaced Liberator Express.

References

External links
 
Ski Map.org – trail maps – Mission Ridge ski area

Ski areas and resorts in Washington (state)
Buildings and structures in Chelan County, Washington
Tourist attractions in Chelan County, Washington
1966 establishments in Washington (state)